Sir John Arthur Brabham  (2 April 1926 – 19 May 2014) was an Australian racing driver who was Formula One World Champion in , , and . He was a founder of the Brabham racing team and race car constructor that bore his name.

Brabham was a Royal Australian Air Force flight mechanic and ran a small engineering workshop before he started racing midget cars in 1948. His successes with midgets in Australian and New Zealand road racing events led to his going to Britain to further his racing career. There he became part of the Cooper Car Company's racing team, building as well as racing cars. He contributed to the design of the mid-engined cars that Cooper introduced to Formula One and the Indianapolis 500, and won the Formula One world championship in 1959 and 1960. In 1962 he established his own Brabham marque with fellow Australian Ron Tauranac, which in the 1960s became the largest manufacturer of customer racing cars in the world. In the 1966 Formula One season Brabham became the first – and still, the only – man to win the Formula One world championship driving one of his own cars. He was the last surviving World Champion of the 1950s.

Brabham retired to Australia after the 1970 Formula One season, where he bought a farm and maintained business interests, which included the Engine Developments racing engine manufacturer and several garages.

Early life
John Arthur 'Jack' Brabham was born on 2 April 1926 in Hurstville, New South Wales, then a commuter town outside Sydney. Brabham was involved with cars and mechanics from an early age. At the age of 12, he learned to drive the family car and the trucks of his father's grocery business. Brabham attended technical college, studying metalwork, carpentry, and technical drawing.

Brabham's early career continued the engineering theme. At the age of 15 he left school to work, combining a job at a local garage with an evening course in mechanical engineering. Brabham soon branched out into his own business selling motorbikes, which he bought and repaired for sale, using his parents' back veranda as his workshop.

One month after his 18th birthday on 19 May 1944 Brabham enlisted into the Royal Australian Air Force (RAAF). Although he was keen on becoming a pilot, there was already a surplus of trained aircrew and the Air Force instead put his mechanical skills to use as a flight mechanic, of which there was a wartime shortage. He was based at RAAF Station Williamtown, where he maintained Bristol Beaufighters at No. 5 Operational Training Unit. On his 20th birthday, 2 April 1946, Brabham was discharged from the RAAF with the rank of leading aircraftman. He then started a small service, repair, and machining business in a workshop built by his uncle on a plot of land behind his grandfather's house.

Racing career

Australia

Brabham started racing after an American friend, Johnny Schonberg, persuaded him to watch a midget car race. Midget racing was a category for small open-wheel cars racing on dirt ovals. It was popular in Australia, attracting crowds of up to 40,000. Brabham records that he was not taken with the idea of driving, being convinced that the drivers "were all lunatics" but he agreed to build a car with Schonberg.

At first Schonberg drove the homemade device, powered by a modified JAP motorcycle engine built by Brabham in his workshop. In 1948, Schonberg's wife persuaded him to stop racing and on his suggestion Brabham took over. He almost immediately found that he had a knack for the sport, winning on his third night's racing. From there he was a regular competitor and winner in Midgets (known as Speedcars in Australia) at tracks such Sydney's Cumberland Speedway, the Sydney Showground, and the Sydney Sports Ground, as well as interstate tracks such as Adelaide's Kilburn and Rowley Park speedways and the Ekka in Brisbane. Brabham has since said that it was "terrific driver training. You had to have quick reflexes: in effect you lived—or possibly died—on them."  Due to the time required to prepare the car, the sport also became his living. Brabham won the 1948 Australian Speedcar Championship, the 1949 Australian and South Australian Speedcar championships, and the 1950–1951 Australian championship with the car.

After successfully running the midget at some hillclimbing events in 1951, Brabham became interested in road racing. He bought and modified a series of racing cars from the Cooper Car Company, a British constructor, and from 1953 concentrated on this form of racing, in which drivers compete on closed tarmac circuits. He was supported by his father and by the Redex fuel additive company, although his commercially aware approach—including the title RedeX Special painted on the side of his Cooper-Bristol—did not go down well with the Confederation of Australian Motor Sport (CAMS), which banned the advertisement. Brabham competed in Australia and New Zealand until early 1955, taking "a long succession of victories", including the 1953 Queensland Road Racing championship. During this time, he picked up the nickname "Black Jack", which has been variously attributed to his dark hair and stubble, to his "ruthless" approach on the track, and to his "propensity for maintaining a shadowy silence". After the 1954 New Zealand Grand Prix, Brabham was persuaded by Dean Delamont, competitions manager of the Royal Automobile Club in the United Kingdom, to try a season of racing in Europe, then the international centre of road racing.

Europe

Cooper

Upon arriving in Europe on his own in early 1955, Brabham based himself in the UK, where he bought another Cooper to race in national events. His crowd-pleasing driving style initially betrayed his dirt track origins: as he put it, he took corners "by using full [steering] lock and lots of throttle". Visits to the Cooper factory for parts led to a friendship with Charlie and John Cooper, who told the story that after many requests for a drive with the factory team, Brabham was given the keys to the transporter taking the cars to a race. Brabham soon "seemed to merge into Cooper Cars": he was not an employee, but he started working at Cooper daily from the midpoint of the 1955 season building a Bobtail mid-engined sports car, intended for Formula One, the top category of single seater racing. He made his Grand Prix debut at the age of 29 driving the car at the 1955 British Grand Prix. It had a 2-litre engine, half a litre less than permitted, and ran slowly with a broken clutch before retiring. Later in the year Brabham, again driving the Bobtail, tussled with Stirling Moss for third place in a non-championship Formula One race at Snetterton. Although Moss finished ahead, Brabham saw the race as a turning point, proving that he could compete at this level. He shipped the Bobtail back to Australia, where he used it to win the 1955 Australian Grand Prix before selling it to help fund a permanent move to the UK the following year with his wife Betty and their son Geoff.

Brabham briefly and unsuccessfully campaigned his own second hand Formula One Maserati 250F during 1956, but his season was saved by drives for Cooper in sports cars and Formula Two, the junior category to Formula One. At that time, almost all racing cars had their engines mounted at the front but Coopers were different, having the engine placed behind the driver, which improved their handling. In 1957, Brabham drove another mid-engined Cooper, again only fitted with a 2-litre engine, at the Monaco Grand Prix. He avoided a large crash at the first corner and was running third towards the end of the race when the fuel pump mount failed. After more than three hours of racing, the exhausted Brabham, who "hated to be beaten", pushed the car to the line to finish sixth. The following year, he was Autocar Formula Two champion in a Cooper, while continuing to score minor points-scoring positions with the small-engined Coopers in the World Drivers' Championship and driving for Aston Martin in Sportscars. His schedule necessitated a considerable amount of travel on the roads of Europe. Brabham's driving on public roads was described as "safe as houses", unlike many of his contemporaries—on the way back from the 1957 Pescara Grand Prix, passenger Tony Brooks took over driving after Brabham refused to overtake a long line of lorries. In late 1958, Brabham rekindled his interest in flying and began taking lessons. He bought his own plane and on gaining his licence began to make heavy use of it piloting himself, his family, and members of his team around Europe to races.

In 1959, Cooper obtained 2.5-litre engines for the first time and Brabham put the extra power to good use by winning his first world championship race at the season-opening Monaco Grand Prix after Jean Behra's Ferrari and Stirling Moss's Cooper failed. More podium places were followed by a win in the British Grand Prix at Aintree after Brabham preserved his tyres to the end of the race, enabling him to finish ahead of Moss who had to pit to replace worn tyres. This gave him a 13-point championship lead with four races to go. At the Portuguese Grand Prix at Monsanto Park, Brabham was chasing race leader Moss when a backmarker moved over on him and launched the Cooper into the air. The airborne car hit a telegraph pole, throwing Brabham onto the track, where he narrowly avoided being hit by one of his teammates but escaped with no serious injury. With two wins each, Brabham, Moss, and Ferrari's Tony Brooks were all capable of winning the championship at the final event of the season, the United States Grand Prix at Sebring. Brabham was among those up until 1 am the morning before the race working on the Cooper team cars. The next day, after pacing himself behind Moss, who soon retired with a broken gearbox, he led almost to the end of the race before running out of fuel on the last lap. He again pushed the car to the finish line to place fourth, although in the event this was unnecessary as his other title rival, Brooks, finished only third. His championship-winning margin over Brooks was four points. According to Gerald Donaldson, "some thought [his title] owed more to stealth than skill, an opinion at least partly based on Brabham's low-key presence."

Despite his success with Cooper, Brabham was sure he could do better. He considered buying Cooper in partnership with Roy Salvadori and then in late 1959 he asked his friend Ron Tauranac to come to the UK and work with him, producing upgrade kits for Sunbeam Rapier and Triumph Herald road cars at his car dealership, Jack Brabham Motors, but with the long-term aim of designing racing cars. Brabham continued to drive for Cooper, but on the long flight back from the 1960 season-opening Argentine Grand Prix, he had a heart-to-heart with John Cooper. John's father Charlie and the designer Owen Maddock had been reluctant to update their car, but although a Cooper had won in Argentina, other cars had been faster before they broke down. Brabham helped design the more advanced Cooper T53, including advice from Tauranac. Brabham spun the new car out of the next championship race, the Monaco Grand Prix, but then embarked on a series of five straight victories. He won from the front at the Dutch, French, and Belgian Grands Prix, where title rival Moss was badly injured in a practice accident that put him out for two months. Two other drivers were killed during the race. At the British Grand Prix, Brabham was closing on Graham Hill's BRM before Hill spun off, leaving Brabham the victory. He then came back from eighth place to second at the Portuguese Grand Prix after sliding off on tramlines and won after race leader John Surtees crashed. Brabham's points total was put out of reach when the British teams withdrew from the Italian GP on safety grounds. Mike Lawrence writes that Brabham's expertise in setting up the cars was a significant factor in Cooper's 1960 drivers' and constructors' titles.

Coventry Climax were late in producing the smaller 1.5-litre engine required for the 1961 season and the Cooper-Climaxes were outclassed by new mid-engined cars from Porsche, Lotus, and championship-winners Ferrari. Brabham scored only three points and finished 11th in the championship. He had a little more success in the non-championship Formula One races, where he ran his own private Coopers and took three victories at Snetterton (26 March), Brussels (9 April), and Aintree (22 April).

The same year, Brabham entered the famous Indianapolis 500 oval race for the first time in a modified version of the Formula One Cooper. It had a 2.7-litre Climax engine producing  compared to the 4.4-litre,  Offenhauser engines used by the front-engined roadsters driven by all the other entrants. Jack qualified a respectable 17th at 145.144 mp/h (pole winner Eddie Sachs qualified at 147.481 mp/h), and while the front-engined roadsters were much faster on the long front and back straights, the rear-engined Cooper's superior handling through the turns and the shorter north and south sections kept the reigning World Champion competitive. Brabham ran as high as third before finishing ninth, completing all 200 laps. Although most of the doubters in the American Indycar scene claimed that rear-engine cars were for drivers who like to be pushed around, as Brabham put it, it "triggered the rear-engined revolution at Indy" and within five years most of the cars that raced at Indianapolis would be rear-engined.

Brabham

Brabham and Tauranac set up a company called Motor Racing Developments (MRD), which produced customer racing cars, while Brabham himself continued to race for Cooper. MRD produced cars for Formula Junior, with the first one appearing in mid-1961. Brabham left Cooper in 1962 to drive for his own team: the Brabham Racing Organisation, using cars built by Motor Racing Developments. A newly introduced engine limit in Formula One of 1500 cc did not suit Brabham and he did not win a single race with a 1500 cc car. His team suffered poor reliability during this period and motorsport authors Mike Lawrence and David Hodges have said that Brabham's reluctance to spend money may have cost the team results, a view echoed by Tauranac. During the 1965 season, Brabham started to consider retirement to manage his team. Dan Gurney took the lead driver role, and the team's first world championship win, while Brabham gave up his car to several other drivers towards the end of the season. At the end of the season, Gurney announced his intention to leave and set up his own team and Brabham decided to carry on.

In 1966, a new 3-litre formula was created for Formula One. The new engines under development by other suppliers all had at least 12 cylinders and proved difficult to develop, being heavy and unreliable. Brabham took a different approach to the problem of obtaining a suitable engine: he persuaded Australian engineering company Repco to develop a new 3-litre eight-cylinder engine for him. Repco had no experience in designing complete engines. Brabham had identified a supply of suitable engine blocks obtained from Oldsmobile's aluminium alloy 215 engine and persuaded the company that an engine could be designed around the block, largely using existing components. Brabham and Repco were aware that the engine would not compete in terms of outright power, but felt that a lightweight, reliable engine could achieve good championship results while other teams were still making their new designs reliable.

The combination of the Repco engine and the Brabham BT19 chassis designed by Tauranac worked. At the French Grand Prix at Reims-Gueux, Jack Brabham took his first Formula One world championship win since 1960 and became the first man to win such a race in a car of his own construction. Only his two former teammates, Bruce McLaren and Dan Gurney, have since matched this achievement. It was the first in a run of four straight wins for the Australian veteran. The 40-year-old Brabham was annoyed by press stories about his age and, in a highly uncharacteristic stunt, at the Dutch Grand Prix he hobbled to his car on the starting grid before the race wearing a long false beard and leaning on a cane before going on to win the race. Brabham confirmed his third championship at the Italian Grand Prix and became the only driver to win the Formula One World Championship in a car that carried his own name.

The season also saw the fruition of Brabham's relationship with Japanese engine manufacturer Honda in Formula Two. After a generally unsuccessful season in 1965, Honda revised their 1-litre engine completely. Brabham won ten of the year's 16 European Formula Two races in his Brabham-Honda. There was no European Formula Two championship that year, but Brabham won the Trophées de France, a championship consisting of six of the French Formula Two races.

In 1967, the Formula One title went to Brabham's teammate Denny Hulme. Hulme had better reliability through the year, possibly due to Brabham's desire to try new parts first.

Despite taking pole position in the first two rounds, mechanical problems halted his chances of victory. He spun numerous times in South Africa, and at Monaco, his engine blew up at the start, and the win went to his teammate Denny Hulme. At the Dutch Grand Prix, he scored his first podium of the season, with second place, behind Scotsman Jim Clark. He retired in the Belgian Grand Prix with another blown engine. He fixed this by winning the French Grand Prix at the Bugatti Circuit in Le Mans. He came fourth at the British Grand Prix, behind Chris Amon, his teammate Hulme, and Clark. At the German Grand Prix, he had a huge battle with Amon, and Brabham eventually finished ahead of the New Zealander, by only half a second. Hulme was the winner. At the first ever Canadian Grand Prix at Mosport Park, he took a huge win, ahead of Hulme, in cold and rainy conditions. At the Italian Grand Prix at Monza, Brabham had to finish second, only a few car lengths behind John Surtees, who took his last GP win. Hulme retired from the race, cutting the gap to 3 points between the two, as the circus headed for the United States, at Watkins Glen for the United States Grand Prix. Brabham outqualified his teammate, and finished fifth in the race, and with Hulme on the podium, this meant the championship chances were looking slim for Black Jack, as the circus went to Mexico for the championship deciding and final race of the season. Once again, he outqualified his teammate, and needed to win, with Hulme fifth or lower. But Jim Clark was simply too fast during the whole weekend, and dominated the race from pole to win, with Brabham finishing over 1 minute and 25 seconds behind. Hulme finished third, and so the New Zealander won the championship, while Brabham settled for second place. The team secured the Constructors' Championship, with 67 total points scored, and 23 points ahead of Lotus which scored a total of 44 points.

Brabham raced alongside his teammate Jochen Rindt during the 1968 season. It wasn't a good season for him. He retired from the first seven races, before scoring two points for fifth place at the German Grand Prix. He retired from the remaining four races. At the end of the year, he fulfilled a desire to fly from Britain to Australia in a small twin-engined Beechcraft Queen Air. Partway through the 1969 season, Brabham suffered serious injuries to his foot in a testing accident. He returned to racing before the end of the year, but promised his wife that he would retire after the season finished and sold his share of the team to Tauranac.

Finding no top drivers available despite coming close to bringing Rindt back to the team, Brabham decided to race for one more year. He began auspiciously, winning the first race of the season, the South African Grand Prix, and then led the third race, the Monaco Grand Prix until the very last turn of the last lap. Brabham was about to hold off the onrushing Rindt (the eventual 1970 F1 champion) when his front wheels locked in a skid on the sharp right turn only yards from the finish and he ended up second. While leading at the British Grand Prix at Brands Hatch, he ran out of fuel at Clearways and Rindt passed him to take the win while Brabham coasted to the finish in second place. After the 13th and final race of the season, the Mexican Grand Prix, Brabham did retire. He had tied Jackie Stewart for fifth in the points standings in the season he drove at the age of 44. Brabham also drove for the works Matra team during the 1970 World Sportscar Championship season and won the final race of the season and his final top level race at the Paris 1000 km in October that year. He then made a complete break from racing and returned to Australia, to the relief of his wife who had been "scared stiff" each time he drove.

Retirement

Following his retirement, Brabham and his family moved to a farm between Sydney and Melbourne. Brabham says that he "never really wanted" the move, but his wife hoped their sons could grow up away from motorsport. As well as running the new venture, he continued his interest in businesses in the UK and Australia, including a small aviation company and garages and car dealerships. He also set up Engine Developments Ltd. in 1971 with John Judd, who had worked for Brabham on the Repco engine project in the mid 1960s. The company builds engines for racing applications. Brabham was also a shareholder in Jack Brabham Engines Pty Ltd., an Australian company marketing Jack Brabham memorabilia.

The Brabham team continued in Formula One, winning two further Drivers' Championships in the early 1980s under Bernie Ecclestone's ownership. Although the original organisation went into administration in 1992, the name was attached to a German company selling cars and accessories in 2008, and an unsuccessful attempt to set up a new Formula One team the following year. On both occasions the Brabham family, which was unconnected to the ventures, announced its intention to take legal advice. In September 2014, Brabham's youngest son David announced Project Brabham, a new team planning to use a crowdsourcing business model to enter the 2015 FIA World Endurance Championship in the LMP2 category.

Despite his three titles, and although John Cooper considered him "the greatest", Formula One journalist Adam Cooper wrote in 1999 that Brabham is never listed among the Top 10 of all time, noting that "Stirling Moss and Jim Clark dominated the headlines when Jack was racing, and they still do". Brabham was the first post-war racing driver to be knighted when he received the honour in 1978 for services to motorsport. He has received several other honours and in 2011, the suburb of Brabham in Perth, Western Australia, was named after him. A race circuit and an automotive training school were also named after him in the early 2010s.

In retirement, Brabham continued to be involved in motorsport events, appearing at contemporary and historic motorsport events around the world where he often drove his former Cooper and Brabham cars until the early 2000s. In 1999, after competing at the Goodwood Revival at the age of 73 he commented that driving stopped him getting old. Despite a large accident at the 2000 Revival, the first racing accident to put him in hospital overnight, he continued to drive until at least 2004. By the late 2000s, ill-health was preventing him from driving in competition. In addition to the deafness caused by years of motor racing without adequate ear protection, his eyesight was reduced due to macular degeneration and he had kidney disease for which by 2009 he was receiving dialysis three times a week. Nonetheless, that year he attended a celebration of the 50th anniversary of his first world championship at the Phillip Island Classic festival of motorsport, and in 2010 flew to Bahrain with most of the other Formula One world Drivers' Champions for a celebration of 60 years of the Formula One world championship. Brabham was the oldest surviving F1 champion.

Brabham and Betty had three sons together: Geoff, Gary, and David. All three became involved in motorsport, with support from Brabham in their early years. Between them, they have won sportscar and single-seater races and championships. Geoff was an Indycar and sportscar racer who won five North American sportscar championships as well as the 24 Hours of Le Mans, while David competed in Formula One for the Brabham team and has also won the Le Mans race as well as three Japanese and North American sportscar titles. Gary also drove briefly in Formula One, although his F1 career consisted of two DNPQ's for the Life team. Brabham and Betty divorced in 1994 after 43 years. Brabham married his second wife, Margaret in 1995 and they lived on the Gold Coast, Queensland. Brabham's grandson Matthew (son of Geoff) graduated from karts in 2010 and won two ladders of the Road to Indy, eventually racing in the 2016 Indianapolis 500 and winning three Stadium Super Trucks championships. Another grandson, Sam, the son of David and Lisa, whose brother Mike also was an F1 driver, stepped up to car racing from karts in 2013 when he made his debut in the British Formula Ford Championship. The Brabham family have been involved in world-class motorsport for over 60 years.

Death
Brabham made his last public appearance on 18 May 2014, appearing with one of the cars he built. He died at his home on the Gold Coast on 19 May 2014, aged 88, following a lengthy battle with liver disease. He was eating breakfast with his wife, Margaret, when he died. In a statement on the family's website, Brabham's son David confirmed his father's death.

"It's a very sad day for all of us", David Brabham stated. "My father passed away peacefully at home at the age of 88 this morning. He lived an incredible life, achieving more than anyone would ever dream of and he will continue to live on through the astounding legacy he leaves behind."

Brabham was the last surviving world champion from the 1950s era.

At his request, his ashes were scattered at the Tamborine Mountain Skywalk in Queensland Australia by his wife, Lady Margaret Brabham on 4 September 2014. Brabham was a frequent visitor to the Skywalk.

Honours and awards
 Officer of the Order of the British Empire (OBE; for services to international motor-car racing, 1966)
 Australian of the Year (1966)
 Knight Bachelor (for distinguished service to the sport of motor racing, 1979)
 Inductee, Sport Australia Hall of Fame (1985, elevated to Legend status in 2003)
 Australian Sports Medal (2000)
 Centenary Medal (2001)
 Officer of the Order of Australia (AO; for service to motor sport as an ambassador, mentor and promoter of safety, and to the community through support of charitable organisations, 2008)
 Inductee, Australian Speedway Hall of Fame (2011)
 Named a National Living Treasure (2012)

Racing record

Career summary

Complete Formula One World Championship results
(key) (Races in bold indicate pole position; races in italics indicate fastest lap)

* Indicates shared drive with Mike MacDowel
† Indicates Formula 2 car

Formula One non-championship results 
(key) (Races in bold indicate pole position) (Races in italics indicate fastest lap)

Complete Tasman Series results

Complete World Sportscar Championship results
(key) (Races in bold indicate pole position) (Races in italics indicate fastest lap)

Complete 24 Hours of Le Mans results

Indy 500 results

Complete British Saloon Car Championship results
(key) (Races in bold indicate pole position; races in italics indicate fastest lap.)

† Events with 2 races staged for the different classes.

Complete Bathurst 1000 results

Notes

References

Citations

Sources

External links

 
 
 
 

 Jack Brabham statistics
 Interactive Jack Brabham Statistics – compare Jack with other F1 drivers
 Official Australian website 
 Official US website
 Clip of Desert Island Discs appearance 19 December 1966

1926 births
2014 deaths
Jack
Australian Formula One drivers
Formula One team owners
Formula One team principals
Formula One engineers
Cooper Formula One drivers
Rob Walker Racing Team Formula One drivers
Brabham Formula One drivers
Formula One World Drivers' Champions
Formula One race winners
International Motorsports Hall of Fame inductees
Indianapolis 500 drivers
British Touring Car Championship drivers
Australian Touring Car Championship drivers
24 Hours of Le Mans drivers
Tasman Series drivers
Racing drivers from Sydney
Australian Knights Bachelor
People in sports awarded knighthoods
Australian Officers of the Order of the British Empire
Officers of the Order of Australia
Australian of the Year Award winners
BRDC Gold Star winners
Recipients of the Australian Sports Medal
Recipients of the Centenary Medal
Sport Australia Hall of Fame inductees
World Sportscar Championship drivers
24 Hours of Daytona drivers
Sportsmen from New South Wales
Australian expatriate sportspeople in England
Australian motorsport people
Royal Australian Air Force airmen
Royal Australian Air Force personnel of World War II
Deaths from liver disease
Porsche Motorsports drivers